Hoshihananomia is a genus of tumbling flower beetles in the family Mordellidae. There are at least 40 described species in Hoshihananomia.

Species
These 43 species belong to the genus Hoshihananomia:

 Hoshihananomia antaretica (White, 1846)
 Hoshihananomia auromaculata  g
 Hoshihananomia composita (Walker, 1858) g
 Hoshihananomia elegans (Maeklin, 1875)
 Hoshihananomia formosana Nakane & Normura, 1950 g
 Hoshihananomia gabonica (Píc, 1920)
 Hoshihananomia gacognei (Mulsant, 1852) g
 Hoshihananomia hononomi Kônô
 Hoshihananomia inflammata (LeConte, 1862) i c g b
 Hoshihananomia katoi Nakane & Nomura, 1957 g
 Hoshihananomia kirai Nakane & Nomura, 1950 g
 Hoshihananomia kuatunensis Ermisch, 1968
 Hoshihananomia kurosai Chûjô & Nakane, 1955
 Hoshihananomia kusuii Nomura, 1975
 Hoshihananomia libanica (Méquignon, 1942)
 Hoshihananomia luteonotatipennis (Píc, 1936)
 Hoshihananomia maroniensis (Pic, 1924) g
 Hoshihananomia masatakai Tsuru & Takakuwa, 2007 g
 Hoshihananomia michaelae Horák, 1986
 Hoshihananomia minuscula Nomura, 1967 g
 Hoshihananomia mitsuoi Nakane & Nomura, 1950
 Hoshihananomia nakanei Takakuwa, 1986 g
 Hoshihananomia notabilis (M'Leay, 1887)
 Hoshihananomia ochrothorax Nomura, 1975
 Hoshihananomia octomaculata (McLeay, 1873)
 Hoshihananomia octopunctata (Fabricius, 1775) i c g b
 Hoshihananomia olbrechtsi Ermisch, 1952
 Hoshihananomia oshimae Nomura, 1967 g
 Hoshihananomia paolii Franciscolo, 1943
 Hoshihananomia perlata (Sulzer, 1776) g
 Hoshihananomia perlineata (Fall, 1907) i c g b
 Hoshihananomia picta (Chevrolat, 1829) g
 Hoshihananomia pirika Kôno, 1935
 Hoshihananomia pseudauromaculata Kiyoyama, 1993 g
 Hoshihananomia pseudoelegans Franciscolo, 1952
 Hoshihananomia pseudohananomi Kiyoyama, 1993
 Hoshihananomia schoutedeni Ermisch, 1952
 Hoshihananomia signifera Ermisch, 1965
 Hoshihananomia tibialis (Broun, 1880)
 Hoshihananomia transsylvanica Ermisch, 1977 g
 Hoshihananomia trichopalpis Nomura, 1975
 Hoshihananomia tristis Ermisch, 1952
 Hoshihananomia ussuriensis Ermisch, 1970

Data sources: i = ITIS, c = Catalogue of Life, g = GBIF, b = Bugguide.net

References

Further reading

External links

 

Mordellidae